"Takes a Little Time" is a 1985 dance hit by British, techno-soul, duo, Total Contrast. Their debut American release went to number one on the U.S. dance chart for one week. "Takes a Little Time" did not make the Hot 100 but,  peaked at number eighty on the R&B singles chart. The song also reached number 17 in the UK Charts.

References

1985 singles
1985 songs
Song articles with missing songwriters